Crime Patrol may refer to:
 Crime Patrol (TV series), an Indian TV series first broadcast in 2003
 Crime Patrol (video game), a 1993 laserdisc game
 Crime Patrol 2: Drug Wars, a 1994 sequel
 The Crime Patrol, a 1936 American film directed by Eugene Cummings
 Crime Patrol, a 1948–1950 EC comic, later continued as The Crypt of Terror and Tales from the Crypt (comics)
 Neighborhood watch, or citizen crime patrol

See also
 Police
 Safety patrol
 Patrol (disambiguation)